This is a list of airports in Qatar, sorted by location.



Airports

See also 
 Old Airport (Doha), a city district
 Transport in Qatar
 List of airports by ICAO code: O#OT - Qatar
 Wikipedia:WikiProject Aviation/Airline destination lists: Asia#Qatar

References

External links
 

Qatar
 
Airports
Airports
Qatar